Wander Luiz may refer to:

 Wander Luiz (footballer, born 1987), full name Wander Luiz Bitencourt Junior, Brazilian football attacking midfielder
 Wander Luiz (footballer, born 1992), full name Wander Luiz Queiroz Dias, Brazilian football forward